Ribeiras del Morrazo is a Spanish geographical indication for Vino de la Tierra wines located in the autonomous region of Galicia. Vino de la Tierra is one step below the mainstream Denominación de Origen indication on the Spanish wine quality ladder, and mirrors the Vins de pays of French wine.

The area covered by this geographical indication comprises the municipalities of Pontevedra, Poio, Vilaboa, Bueu, Cangas, Moaña, Marín, and Redondela, in the province of Pontevedra, in Galicia, Spain.

It acquired its Vino de la Tierra status in 2018.

Authorised Grape Varieties
The authorised grape varieties are:

 Red: Tempranillo, Cabernet Sauvignon, Merlot, Syrah, Tintilla de Rota, Brancellao, Caíño Tinto, Pedral, Espadeiro, Loureiro Tinto, Mencía, and Sousón
 White: Albariño, Caíño Blanco, Godello, Loureira, Treixadura, Branco Lexítimo, and Torrontés

References

Wine regions of Spain
Spanish wine
Appellations
Wine classification
Galicia (Spain)